Päijänne Tavastia Aviation Museum is an aviation museum in Asikkala, near Lahti, Finland. It opened in its current form on 19 May 2006. The museum was previously known as Vesivehmaan varastohalli (the Vesivehmaa storage hall).

The museum displays mainly aircraft of the Finnish Air Force. In 1948, the Finnish Air Force began separating and storing some of the aircraft that had been taken out of service. The aircraft were stored in hangar 4 on former World War II air force base of Vesivehmaa (presently known as Lahti-Vesivehmaa airport, EFLA). They also had a large number of older aircraft in storage. By the end of the 1940s, many of the World War II-era aircraft were sold as scrap. During the late 1970s the aircraft were moved to their current location in hangar 1.

The museum is run by "Lahden ilmasilta" (LIS), a guild association, which was founded on 15 November 1962. The association wanted to preserve the aircraft that remained, which numbered about 20. The museum has about 2,000 visitors per year.

On display
Former aircraft of the Finnish Air Force
Blackburn Ripon IIF – the only complete Ripon left 
Folland Gnat Mk.1
Fouga Magister CM 170
MiG-15 UTI
MiG-21bis
Mil Mi-8P
Saab 35 Draken

Finnish Air Force aircraft, which have not been restored
Aero A-32
Caudron C.59
Caudron-Renault CR.714
Vampire Mk.55
I.V.L. D.26 Haukka I
VL E.30 Kotka II

Civil aircraft, which have not been restored
I.V.L. K.1 Kurki
Republic RC-3 Seabee
Kassel 12A

Gallery

External links 

 Lahden Ilmasilta
 From the opening of the museum 19 May 2006

Aerospace museums in Finland
Asikkala
Museums in Päijät-Häme